HIG1 hypoxia inducible domain family member 1B is a protein that in humans is encoded by the HIGD1B gene.

Function

This gene encodes a member of the hypoxia inducible gene 1 (HIG1) domain family. The encoded protein is localized to the cell membrane and has been linked to tumorigenesis and the progression of pituitary adenomas. Alternative splicing results in multiple transcript variants.

References

Further reading